Raymond Douglas Smith (1 April 1923 – 25 December 1984) was a South African cricketer who played first-class cricket for North Eastern Transvaal from 1950 to 1956.

A wicket-keeper and tail-end batsman, Smith was North Eastern Transvaal's regular wicket-keeper in the 1951–52, 1952–53 and 1953–54 seasons. He made his highest score of 49 batting at number nine against Orange Free State in 1951–52, when he was North Eastern Transvaal's top-scorer.

Smith died in Benoni, Gauteng on 25 December 1984, at the age of 61.

References

External links

 Raymond Smith at CricketArchive

1923 births
1984 deaths
Cricketers from Bloemfontein
Northerns cricketers
South African cricketers
20th-century South African people